The 2018 Ivy League football season was the 63rd season of college football play for the Ivy League and was part of the 2018 NCAA Division I FCS football season. The season began on September 14, 2018, and ended on November 17, 2018. Ivy League teams were 18–6 against non-conference opponents and Princeton won the conference championship, compiling a perfect 10–0 record.

Season overview

Preseason polling
The preseason media poll results became public on August 20, 2018, with Yale predicted to win the Ivy League. Yale won 11 of 17 first place votes in the poll.

Final standings

Schedule

Week 1

Week 2

Week 3

Week 4

Week 5

Week 6

Week 7

Week 8

Week 9

Week 10

Attendance

†Season High

References